Achille Fould (17 November 18005 October 1867) was a French financier and politician.

Early life
Achille Fould was born on 17 November 1800 in Paris. His father, Beer Léon Fould, was a Jewish banker.

Career
Fould began his career as a banker for the family bank. As early as 1842 he entered political life, having been elected in that year as a deputy for the department of the Hautes-Pyrénées. From that time to his death he actively busied himself with the affairs of his country. He readily acquiesced in the revolution of February 1848, and is said to have exercised a decided influence in financial matters on the provisional government then formed. He shortly afterwards published two pamphlets against the use of paper money, entitled, Pas d'Assignats I and Observations sur la question financière.

During the presidency of Louis Napoleon he was four times minister of finance, and took a leading part in the economic reforms then made in France. His strong conservative tendencies led him to oppose the doctrine of free trade, and disposed him to hail the coup d'état and the new empire. On 25 January 1852, in consequence of the decree confiscating the property of the Orléans family, he resigned the office of minister of finance, but was on the same day appointed senator, and soon after rejoined the government as minister of state and of the imperial household. In this capacity he directed the Paris exhibition of 1855. The events of November 1860 led once more to his resignation, but he was recalled to the ministry of finance in November of the following year, and retained office until the publication of the imperial letter of 19 January 1867, when Émile Ollivier became the chief adviser to the emperor. During his last tenure of office he had reduced the floating debt, which the Mexican War had considerably increased, by the negotiation of a loan of 300 million francs (1863).

In 1852, a scheme to establish a credit bank was put forward by the Pereire brothers with the support of Achille Fould (Minister of Finance). Based on this proposal, a Crédit Mobilier was created, which greatly facilitated the construction of new railways and harbours in France.

Fould, besides uncommon financial abilities, had a taste for the fine arts, which he developed and refined during his youth by visiting Italy and the eastern coasts of the Mediterranean. In 1857 he was made a member of the Academy of the Fine Arts.

Personal life
Fould converted to Protestantism in 1858.

Death
Fould died in Tarbes in 1867.

See also
 Fould family

References

External links
 

1800 births
1867 deaths
Businesspeople from Paris
Politicians from Paris
French Protestants
French people of Jewish descent
Orléanists
Party of Order politicians
Bonapartists
French Ministers of Finance
State ministers of France
Government ministers of France
Members of the 6th Chamber of Deputies of the July Monarchy
Members of the 7th Chamber of Deputies of the July Monarchy
Members of the 1848 Constituent Assembly
Members of the National Legislative Assembly of the French Second Republic
French Senators of the Second Empire
French bankers
French financiers
19th-century French businesspeople
Burials at Père Lachaise Cemetery
Converts to Protestantism from Judaism
Fould family